Kidari Sarveswara Rao (died 23 September 2018) was an Indian politician originally representing the YSR Congress Party and later the TDP. He was a Member of the Andhra Pradesh Legislative Assembly from Araku Valley. On 23 September 2018, he was shot dead at Araku valley by Maoists. After the death of Kidari, his son named Kidari Sravan Kumar was elected as State Tribal Welfare Minister without participation in Public Election by TDP Government.

References

Telugu Desam Party politicians
Andhra Pradesh MLAs 2014–2019
Place of birth missing
2018 deaths
Year of birth missing
Date of birth missing
Assassinated Indian politicians
People from Visakhapatnam district
Naxalite–Maoist insurgency
YSR Congress Party politicians